The African Great Lakes kingdoms refers to the numerous historic kingdoms in the African Great Lakes region. These polities existed in the eighteenth and nineteenth centuries, and had similar and yet sometimes distinct cultures, values and traditions. The Great Lakes kingdoms were found in Southeast Africa and some parts of Central Africa, in what is present-day northwest Tanzania, south Uganda, some parts of Rwanda, Burundi and Eastern Congo.

Bunyoro
Buganda
Bugisu
Bukedi
Burundi
Busoga
Buvinza
Buyungu
Buzinza
Gisaka
Heru Kingdom 
Igara
Ihangiro
Karagwe
Kimwani
Kiziba
Kooki
Kyamutwara
Kyania
Lango
Mpororo
Mubari
Muhambwe
Nkore
Ruguru
Rusubi
Rwanda
Rwenzururu
Sebei
Teso
Tooro

Great Lakes Region: Karagwe, Nkore, and Buhaya
Karagwe, Nkore, and Buhaya formed small neighboring states to the major kingdoms of Bunyoro and Buganda in the Great Lakes region. Karagwe and Nkore were individual polities, while Buhaya refers to an area along the western side of Lake Victoria in which seven small states were recognized: Kiamutwara, Kiziba, Ihangiro, Kihanja, Bugabo, Maruku, and Missenye.

Although this entry only deals with the period up to the end of the eighteenth century, it is essential to recognize that the earlier histories of these polities and the detail with which they have been recorded are a direct product of nineteenth- and twentieth-century history and the circumstances which befell them. Nkore (Ankole in colonial times) found itself within the British Protectorate of Uganda and became a cornerstone of Protectorate policy, being one of the four main kingdoms and enjoying a considerably enlarged territorial status under the Protectorate than it had done in precolonial times. It was also served well by various missionaries, ethnographers, anthropologists, and historians. Buhaya was moderately well served, partly through expedient politics in the early colonial era and the siting of the regional colonial administrative center in Bukoba. By contrast, Karagwe fell from being one of the most powerful of the nineteenth century states in the Great Lakes, a position it had largely attained through its domination of early Indian Ocean-Great Lakes trade routes, to total collapse and obscurity by 1916. Writers on Karagwe have been sporadic and have failed to provide the rich array of texts that are available for Nkore, its northern neighbor. In independent Tanzania, under Nyerere, there was little place for such overtly unequal, precolonial political formations. 

Not surprisingly, the earliest farming settlements appeared in the wet coastal littoral of Buhaya, on the western shores of Lake Victoria. Archaeological research has indicated extensive activity, most notably in terms of iron smelting, from the last few centuries BCE. These societies exploited the extensive rainforests that were available at the time and, after initial cultivation of yams and other forest crops, presumably became proficient in the exploitation of bananas. Linguistic and archaeological evidence in Karagwe and Nkore on the other hand, indicates occupation around the beginning of the second millennium, based upon the increasing exploitation of cattle, supported by grain crops. From these bases, the core elements of the polities undoubtedly developed, although there is little evidence, as yet, to document the process.

The actual origins of the dynasties that came to dominate are also unclear, being dependent on the interpretation of oral traditions. At face value, in all areas, dynasties claimed origin back to the Cwezi persona, Wamara. Subsequently, power fell into the hands of Ruhinda, and descent was directly drawn to him by many of the royal clans, known as Abahinda. Reinterpretations of these oral traditions suggest that characters such as Wamara and Ruhinda may well have been charismatic chiefs, who, after their deaths, became important spirits controlled by mediums tied to political power. Shrines to Wamara and Ruhinda were specifically associated with the manipulation and control of fertility.

A further integral component of these polities was clans. Each polity was an amalgamation of clans, and each clan contributed important components to the polity. Clans involved in the polity at an earlier stage tended to be regarded with a higher status. Clans were also associated with specialized activity, such as cattle-herding, iron-smelting, and regulating rituals. The royal clan sat atop this confederation and carefully maintained the status quo, by allocating particular offices to specific clans and by accepting wives for the king from the different clans. Thus, the mother of the king and her clan were very powerful in each individual reign, and this power helps to explain the regularity of succession disputes revealed by oral traditions. Particularly in drier Karagwe and Nkore, there was also an increasing importance in the distinction between cattle-herding Bahima and farmers. In later years, these economic pastimes became almost mutually exclusive and were the foundations of class formation. It is significant, however, that although kings generally leaned toward pastoralism as an ideal lifestyle, even in the later centuries the king stood above the cattle-agriculture dichotomy, practicing rituals which were integral to both economic forms. Most notably, every month kings conducted the New Moon rituals which ensured the fertility of the land and the fecundity of cattle. Furthermore, at least some kings were also regarded as iron smiths (but not smelters). The best-known example of this was the incorporation of iron-working hammers into the royal regalia of Karagwe, generally associated with Omukama Ndagara in the early nineteenth century.

These fairly simplistic reconstructions, of course, mask the major tensions and conflicts that existed within these states. An insight into such political intrigue has been provided by the historical work focusing on the Kaijja shrine, within the Maruku kingdom, twenty kilometers south of Bukoba. The site is the gashani, or jaw-bone shrine, of the seventeenth- and eighteenth-century king, Rugomora Mahe, who is said to have occupied the site and to have overseen iron-working there. The site is also an important shrine to the Cwezi spirit, Wamara. All the Buhaya states record a change from Hinda to Bito rulers around the seventeenth century, referring to the extension of Bito dynastic influence from Bunyoro. Significantly, Rugomora Mahe was an early Bito ruler, and his association with the shrine is interpreted as an integral part of the ritual conflict between Hinda followers and their spirits, and the new Bito rulers. At broadly similar times oral traditions in Karagwe and Nkore record incursions and even lengthy occupations by forces from Bunyoro, but emphasize ultimate victory over the invaders.

In Nkore, it has been possible to identify sites associated with political authority, extending several centuries back into the past. The locations of these sites indicate that the early core Nkore area was in a restricted highland area, Isingiro, twenty kilometers south of the modern center of Mbarara. The suggestion is therefore that these were initially very localized political formations, some of which gradually expanded. Military power was initially realized in terms of numbers. The Buhaya states were all small and do not appear to have had a significant military capability. Karagwe does appear to have had military strength, and this may have been due to its greater population size. Nkore, from its small base, does not appear to have had expansionist pretensions, or more importantly, capability, until key changes in its military organization. The creation of permanent levies of troops, known as Emitwe, allowed both the conquest of territory such as Mpororo and Buhweju and also the protection of its increasing herds from powerful neighbors to the north. 

It is important to emphasize that, in their early stages, all these polities were small and vulnerable. In particular, they appear to have been susceptible to succession disputes, which seem to have been the main cause of conflict. More detailed histories of significant changes in structure and organization only really begin to emerge toward the end of the eighteenth century, when some polities started looking beyond their frontiers for new territories and resources to control.

References

History of Africa
Former monarchies of Africa